King of the Crown is an American reality television series that debuted on TLC in 2009. The series follows the life of pageant coach Cyrus Frakes and his assistants of Gowns and Crowns as they prepare beauty pageant contestants to compete. The premiere episode, King of the Crown, aired on September 30, 2009.  Variety reported an initial order of 12 episodes on August 30, 2009, despite only 8 episodes airing.

Cast
The members of the cast appear as themselves.

Cyrus Frakes, a Pageant Coach
Shane Arrington, a Personal Assistant/Interview Coach
Kyle Taylor, a Booking Agent
Amanda Helen Pennekamp, an Instructor/Beauty Coach

Episodes

References

2009 American television series debuts
2009 American television series endings
2000s American reality television series
Beauty pageants in the United States
English-language television shows
TLC (TV network) original programming
Television shows set in South Carolina
Television series about beauty pageants